Escapology is the practice of escaping from restraints or other traps. Escapologists (also classified as escape artists) escape from handcuffs, straitjackets, cages, coffins, steel boxes, barrels, bags, burning buildings, fish-tanks, and other perils, often in combination.

History
The art of escaping from restraints and confined spaces has been a skill employed by performers for a very long time. It was not originally displayed as an overt act in itself but was instead used secretly to create illusions such as a disappearance or transmutation. In the 1860s, the Davenport Brothers, who were skilled at releasing themselves from rope ties, used the art to convey the impression they were restrained while they created spirit phenomena.

Other illusionists, including John Nevil Maskelyne, worked out how the Davenports did their act and re-created the tricks to debunk the brothers' claims of psychic power. However, the re-creations did not involve overt escape, merely a replication of tricks with the statement that they were accomplished by secret magicians' skills rather than spirits. It took another thirty years before the pure skill of escape began to be displayed as an act in itself. The figure most responsible for making escapology a recognized entertainment was Harry Houdini, who built his career on demonstrating the ability to escape from a huge variety of restraints and difficult situations.

Houdini made no secret of the fact that he was an expert on restraints and the skills needed to overcome them but he often concealed the exact details of his escapes to maintain an air of mystery and suspense. Although many of his escapes relied on technical skills such as lock-picking and contortion, he also performed tricks such as Metamorphosis and the Chinese Water Torture Cell, which are essentially classic stage illusions reliant on cleverly designed props. Houdini's feats helped to define the basic repertoire of escapology, including escapes from handcuffs, padlocks, straitjackets, mail bags, beer barrels, and prison cells.

A succession of performers have added new ideas and created variations on old stunts, but it is common for even the best contemporary escapologists to be dubbed modern day "Houdinis". During his lifetime, Houdini argued his main escape acts were copyrighted, and sued competitors such as John Clempert, who in 1906 apologized and settled out of court. 

Because St. Nicholas Owen successfully escaped the Tower of London and arranged the escape of two Jesuit inmates from the prison, the 16th-century Christian martyr is considered by Catholic escapologists as their patron saint. Along with St. John Don Bosco, the two are considered the primary patrons of Catholic Gospel Magicians.

Societies
The United Kingdom Escape Artists was formed in 2004 and is currently the only organisation in the United Kingdom devoted to the promotion of UK escape artists and the preservation of escapology within the UK. Its members are made up of professional escapologists, restraint collectors, master locksmiths, and historians. The UKEA meet once a year for their AGM.

The International Escapologists Society is an online society with its own monthly newsletter that is dedicated to the art of escape on an international level.

Escape Masters (The International Association of Escape Artists) was formed in 1985 by renowned escape artist Norman Bigelow and has been run by Thomas Blacke as International President of the organization and Editor/Publisher of the magazine since 2001.  This newsletter ceased publication with the passing of Mr. Blacke in 2019.

Founded in February 2021, Global Escapology Organisation (GEO) is an elite group of Escapologists and subject experts from around the world.

Forms of escape performance
Hidden is a style of escape performance popularised by the late Harry Houdini that involved much of the performance taking place behind some form of screen or inside a cabinet in order to protect the secrets of the performer. This style of escape performance was popular with the majority of escape artists until the end of the 20th Century and is still preferred by many performers today. Its disadvantage is that audiences may wrongly believe a concealed assistant to have released the escapologist, whom they may not have seen struggle.
Full View is a form of escape performance that was popularised by Norman Bigelow Sr. during the 1970s. He presented his escapes as pure tests of human skill and endurance and the audience could actually see everything from start to finish. His signature escape, "The Doors of Death," inspired many escape artists to adopt this style of performance in their own shows.  One performer, Jonathon Bryce, took the full view approach to the Buried Alive escape and with the encouragement of Norman Bigelow Sr., made the world debut of Buried Alive in Full View at the Music is Art Festival in Buffalo, NY with the help of Goo Goo Dolls bassist, Robby Takac. Mark Nelson, "The Great Markini" also performed Full View with his Electrified Mummy Lid Torture Board Escape. 
Escape or Die, the form of escape performance originated by Houdini, is the standard for top-of-the-line escapologists. There are at least three possible ways for an escapologist's life to be at risk from the possible failure of this escape. These are death by drowning, as in the water escapes Houdini pioneered; death by suffocation, as in escapes from airtight enclosures containing no water, such as coffins; and death by falling, as also originated by Houdini, in a straitjacket escape hanging high above the earth as when Houdini hung from cranes and buildings upside down in a strait jacket where falling would mean certain death. UK escape artist Alan Alan took this further by hanging from a burning rope hundreds of feet in the air. This type of escapology does fail, and its failures have resulted in escape artists getting hurt or losing their lives.  Others who have done this type of escape include Dorothy Dietrich, Antony Britton, Jonathon Bryce, and Mark Nelson "Markini The Worlds Youngest Professional Escape Artist" highlighted death by electrocution with his "Electrified Mummy Lid Torture Board". Escape was required in under 60 seconds or a fatal charge of electricity would be passed through the chains holding him to the board.

World Records
In 2012, Lucas Wilson, an illusionist from Canada managed the fastest ever recorded escape from a straitjacket while suspended; he escaped in 8.4 seconds while hanging upside down from his ankles at a height of 1m.

In fiction 
The Grim Game, a 1919 film, stars Harry Houdini as a young man who is bound and imprisoned on numerous occasions by a gang who have kidnapped his fiancée. Considered by many as Houdini's best film. Lost for over 90 years and rediscovered in 2015 by escape artist and magician Dorothy Dietrich.
Haldane of the Secret Service, a 1924 film directed by and starring Harry Houdini, who is repeatedly restrained by villains who murdered his detective-father. Filmed at Beaver Kill Falls in Valatie, NY.
The novel The Amazing Adventures of Kavalier & Clay, written by Michael Chabon and winner of the 2001 Pulitzer Prize, features escapology as an important plot point.
Ragtime, by E.L. Doctorow, features Harry Houdini as a major character, and uses escapology as a metaphor for the struggles faced by the American immigrant.
In American superhero comic books, many superheroes like Batman are trained in escapology, which is invaluable when dealing with deathtraps. However,  superheroes who are escapologists by profession include Mister Miracle, Ms. Liberty and The Escapist. (Mister Miracle and The Escapist were both based on escapologist-turned-comic artist Jim Steranko.) Houdini himself appeared as a time/space traveler in the comic book series Daring Escapes featuring Houdini.
The 1953 biographical film, Houdini, starring Tony Curtis in the title role, depicted many of Houdini's escapology performances.  Curtis' performance artist character, The Great Leslie, also performs a suspended straight-jacket escape at the start of the film The Great Race.
In 1971, Christopher George played an escape artist named Cameron Steele in the TV movie/unsold series pilot, Escape. Steele was a non-performing escapologist and night-club owner who, like Bill Bixby's Anthony Blake (The Magician), habitually helped people in trouble.
In 1982, Griffin O'Neal played a junior escapologist named Danny Masters in the film, The Escape Artist.
In 1983, real-life escape artist Bill Shirk played himself in a film called The Escapist.
Yorick, the main character of the comic book Y: The Last Man, is an escape artist.
In the 1991 film, The Linguini Incident, Rosanna Arquette plays an aspiring escape artist.
The novels Specific Gravity and Ontario Lacus by J. Matthew Neal (2007 and 2008) features a scientist who is also a master escape artist.
Paul Adam's Escape from Shadow Island, first published in 2009, features young escapologist Max Cassidy. Two further books in the series, Jaws of Death and Dead Man's Bay, will be released in April 2011 and 2012 respectively.
 Houdini himself - or rather his ghost - appeared in an episode of The Real Ghostbusters; not having lost his touch, the protagonists' ghost traps could not hold him for more than a minute. 
Adam Phillips's essay "Houdini's Box" uses Houdini himself, as well as a young victim of sexual abuse and other examples, to discuss escapology.
The console video game Exit focuses around the exploits of the self-proclaimed escapologist known as Mr. ESC.
The 2006 movie The Prestige deals with two magicians who employ increasingly difficult escape illusions in a competitive one-upmanship, with tragic results.
In the 2013 film, Now You See Me, Isla Fisher plays an escape artist named Henley Reeves. In an interview, she says, "I watched all of Houdini’s work and Dorothy Dietrich, who is a female escapologist, who is amazing, you have to watch her." “I got to train with Dorothy Dietrich, the first lady magician to catch a bullet with her teeth." Fisher studied the life and work of Dietrich to prepare for the role. "Dorothy is a real female escapologist who is working today. She was the first woman to capture a bullet between her teeth, which is an amazing feat. She's not only good at misdirection, but she also connects emotionally with the audience, so she's better able to involve them in the stunts."

List of notable escape artists

 Harry Houdini
 Doc Cunningham
 Alan Alan
 Antony Britton
 Dean Gunnarson
 Frank Reno
 James Randi
 Norman Bigelow
 David Merlini
 Bill Shirk
 Dorothy Dietrich
 Criss Angel
 Michael Griffin
 Kristen Johnson
 Jonathan Goodwin
 Roslyn Walker
 Major Zamora
 Gopinath Muthukad
 Johnny Strange

See also
 Illusionist
 List of magicians
 Stunt performer

References

External links
 Houdini Museum Tour * Magic Show
 Escapology — the magic art of escape
 Busker Central - Rare and historic videos of Escapologists.

 
Magic (illusion)
Magic tricks
Physical restraint

de:Fesselung (physisch)#Entfesselungskunst